"I Taut I Taw A Puddy-Tat" is a novelty song composed and written by Alan Livingston, Billy May and Warren Foster.  It was sung by Mel Blanc, who provided the voice of the bird, Tweety and of his nemesis Sylvester.

The lyrics depict the basic formula of the Tweety-Sylvester cartoons released by Warner Bros. throughout the late 1940s into the early 1960s: Tweety wanting to live a contented life, only to be harassed by Sylvester (who is looking to eat the canary), and Tweety's mistress shooing the cat away. Toward the end of the song, the two perform a duet, with Tweety coaxing Sylvester into singing with him after promising that his (Tweety's) mistress won't chase him (Sylvester) away.

"I Taut I Taw A Puddy-Tat" reached No. 9 on the Billboard pop chart during a seven-week chart run in February and March 1951, and sold more than two million records.

The song was covered by Helen Kane between 1950–51 with Jimmy Carroll & His Orchestra.

Tony Blair had the sheet music for this song upon his piano during the war against Iraq.

In 2011, Warner Bros. created a 3D CGI Looney Tunes short of the same name starring Sylvester, Tweety, and  Granny (June Foray in her final theatrical voice acting role before her death in 2017), incorporating Blanc's vocals with brand new animation and music. The short premiered in theaters with Happy Feet Two.

In 2008, the British comedian Jeremy Hardy sang the song's lyrics to the tune of "I Vow to Thee, My Country", during a live recording of the BBC Radio 4 panel game, I'm Sorry I Haven't a Clue.

References

External links

1950 singles
Novelty songs
Looney Tunes songs
Comedy songs
Songs written by Billy May
1950 songs
Songs about cats
Songs about fictional male characters
Capitol Records singles